Mehmet Aydın is a Turkish politician who was one of Turkey's Ministers of State. As a representative of the Justice and Development Party from Izmir, he was elected to Parliament in the 2002 general elections.

Education and academic career
Mehmet Aydın was born in 1943 in Elazığ. He graduated from the Faculty of Theology at Ankara University in 1966 and received his  Ph.D. in Philosophy from the University of Edinburgh in 1971. He has taught both religion and philosophy at various universities, and served as Dean of the Faculty of Theology at  Dokuz Eylül University, from 1993 to 1999.

References 

Turkish non-fiction writers
Turkish scientists
Turkish philosophers
1943 births
People from Elazığ
Ankara University alumni
Academic staff of Ankara University
Academic staff of Middle East Technical University
Government ministers of Turkey
Living people
Alumni of the University of Edinburgh
Academic staff of Dokuz Eylül University
Justice and Development Party (Turkey) politicians
Members of the 23rd Parliament of Turkey
Members of the 20th Parliament of Turkey
Ministers of State of Turkey
Members of the 60th government of Turkey